Belden is an extinct town in Eagle County, in the U.S. state of Colorado. The GNIS classifies it as a populated place.

The community was named after D. D. Belden, the proprietor of a local mine.

References

Ghost towns in Colorado
Geography of Eagle County, Colorado